A raid took place on the night of 23 or 25 May 1612 when a force of Sicilian and Neapolitan galleys attacked some Tunisian vessels at La Goulette, northern Tunisia. 7, or perhaps 9 or 10, Tunisian sailing ships were destroyed, while several smaller vessels were captured.

Ships involved:

Allies
Sicily (Ottavio d'Aragona Tagliavia)
6 galleys

Naples (Álvaro de Bazán, 2nd Marquess of Santa Cruz)
7 galleys

Tunisia
7 or more sailing ships destroyed, several smaller captured

References
 

1612
1612
Conflicts in 1612
1612 in Africa
1612 in the Ottoman Empire
Naval battles involving the Kingdom of Naples